Joanne Bradford is an American businesswoman and financial technology executive, currently the chief growth officer of MNTN. 

She has had an extensive career in marketing, monetization and operations at technology and financial companies in Silicon Valley and Los Angeles, California.

Education 
Bradford graduated with a BA in Journalism and Advertising at San Diego State University in 1986.

Career 
Bradford's early career was at BusinessWeek and then Microsoft, leading on sales and product marketing for MSN and AdCenter.

She left Microsoft to become executive vice president of national marketing services at the ad agency Spot Runner, a much smaller start up company, in March 2008. where she worked for six months before joining Yahoo! in fall 2008 to head up ad sales as senior vice president of US revenue and market development.

Two years later she took up the role of chief revenue officer at Demand Media, her second move from an established large company to a much smaller startup. The move was not without controversy, being announced in the press before Bradford had told Yahoo! colleagues she was leaving.

After a short spell as president of the San Francisco Chronicle, Bradford joined Pinterest in 2013, leading on early monetization efforts at the company. She left Pinterest in early 2015 following a management reshuffle, having declined an offer to move to another role as head of direct sales.

Later that year she joined lender SoFi as chief operating officer. During her time at the company she was responsible for raising SoFi's profile as a leading fintech brand.

In June 2019, Bradford departed SoFi at the same time as two other executive officers, Kevin Moss and Ashish Jain, in a significant moment for the company not long after its new CEO Anthony Noto joined the company in 2018.

Following her departure from SoFi, she took up the role of president at Honey, a financial start up centered around automating access to discounts and the best online deals, in August 2019. In 2021, Bradford was named the chief growth officer of MNTN, an advertising technology company. 

Bradford has been a member of the executive board of a number of organisations, including Wave, OneLogin, Comscore, and the anti-poverty charity CARE.

Awards and achievements 
Bradford was included in the Forbes CMO Next 2018 List, Ad Age's 100 Most Influential Women in Advertising and was a recipient of the Bill Gates Chairman's Award at Microsoft.

References 

Living people
21st-century American businesswomen
21st-century American businesspeople
San Diego State University alumni
Bloomberg L.P. people
Microsoft people
American women business executives
Yahoo! people
Pinterest people
Year of birth missing (living people)